Camanducaia is the southernmost municipality in Minas Gerais, Brazil. Inhabited by 21,801 in 2020.

The municipality contains part of the  Fernão Dias Environmental Protection Area, created in 1997.

References 

Municipalities in Minas Gerais
Populated places established in 1868